The following are the national records in speed skating in China maintained by the Chinese Skating Association.

Men

Women

References

External links
 Chinese Skating Association web site

National records in speed skating
Speed skating-related lists
Speed skating
Records
Speed skating